Sarajevo main railway station (Bosnian: Glavna željeznička stanica u Sarajevu) is a railway in Sarajevo, the capital of Bosnia and Herzegovina, located in the northwest part of the city, approximately 3 kilometers from the downtown area near city part Marijin Dvor.

History

The railway station was built in 1882 for the narrow gauge railway. Near it, further west of the city were the main railway depot for the whole of Bosnia, where a thousand people were employed at the peak.

In September 1941, the transport of the Sarajevo Jews was dispatched from there by the resolution of Ustashe administration. The Jews were transported in wagons for the cattle to a transfer camp in Travnik.

After World War II, it was decided to replace the old station by a new functionalist building designed by Czechoslovak architects led by Bedřich Hacar. The construction was also supervised by experts from Germany. In its time, it was one of the few projects in the city that was not influenced by socialist realism. However, due to the political turmoil in Czechoslovak-Yugoslav relations, they could not complete their work. Finally, the Croatian architect Bogdan Stojkov finished the new departure hall. The reasons for the construction of the new railway station were several; the track to Sarajevo was rebuilt to a standard gauge of 1435 mm, longer trains were expected and would be not possible to service them. The ceremonial completion of the station building took place in 1949. The station was electrified in 1967, as part of the early electrification programme introduced in Bosnia up to 1969. The Sarajevo–Ploče railway provides a connection to the Adriatic coast. It holds the distinction of being the first 25 kV AC-electrified country in the former Yugoslavia, followed by Croatia and Serbia (both countries introduced electric trains in 1970).

In 1971 the original historic station building was abandoned and pulled down. Railway equipment was damaged between 1992 and 1995, but it was eventually rebuilt in the late 1990s.

Construction
The building has a semi-circular ground plan and is roofed with hyperbolic paraboloid structures. In front of it there is an extensive open-air area and a tramway terminal. The square in front of the station is named after the victims of the Srebrenica massacre. Tracks are entering the station from the west and then turning north, after few hundred meters rail line ends since dismantling of narrow-gauge line to Uvac, Rudo close to Serbian borders in 1978.

Gallery

References

R. DONIJA, Robert. Sarajevo: biografija grada. Sarajevo: Izdavač za istoriju, 2006. 462 s. . (Bosnian)

External links

Railway stations in Bosnia and Herzegovina
Railway stations opened in 1882
Buildings and structures in Sarajevo